Yevdokino is a rural locality (a village) in Osintsevskoye Rural Settlement, Kishertsky District, Perm Krai, Russia. The population was 25 as of 2010.

Geography 
Yevdokino is located 30 km southeast of Ust-Kishert (the district's administrative centre) by road. Osintsevo is the nearest rural locality.

References 

Rural localities in Kishertsky District